Sachidanand is both a given name and a surname. Notable people with the name include:

Vivek Sachidanand (born 1977), Indian sound designer, sound mixer, and recordist
Sachidanand Sinha (1871–1950), Indian lawyer, parliamentarian, and journalist

Indian surnames